Don Chan is a district (amphoe) of Kalasin province, northeastern Thailand.

Geography
Neighbouring districts are (from the south clockwise): Kamalasai, Mueang Kalasin, Na Mon, and Kuchinarai of Kalasin Province, and Pho Chai of Roi Et province.

History
The minor district (king amphoe) was created on 15 July 1996, when it was split off from Mueang Kalasin district.

On 15 May 2007, all 81 minor districts were upgraded to full districts. With publication in the Royal Gazette on 24 August, the upgrade became official.

Administration
The district is divided into five sub-districts (tambons), which are further subdivided into 48 villages (mubans). There are no municipal (thesaban) areas, and five tambon administrative organizations (TAO).

References

External links
amphoe.com

Don Chan